The Giswil Tunnel is a tunnel in central Switzerland. The tunnel bypasses the town of Giswil in the canton of Obwalden, and forms part of the A8 motorway.

References 

Buildings and structures in Obwalden
Transport in Obwalden
Road tunnels in Switzerland